Marie Thérèse (2 January 1667 – 1 March 1672) was the fourth child and third daughter of King Louis XIV of France and his wife, Maria Theresa of Spain. As the king's daughter, she was a Fille de France and was known at court by the traditional honorific of Madame Royale because she was the king's eldest surviving daughter. She did not survive childhood, dying at the age of five due to tuberculosis.

Life
Marie Thérèse was born 2 January 1667 at the Château de Saint-Germain-en-Laye. Her parents had her baptised in the Palais du Louvre in 1668. Her parents reputedly adored the young girl, and her mother wanted her to become the queen of her native Spain. As a fille de France, Marie Thérèse was entitled by law to the style of Her Royal Highness, but was referred to simply as '"Madame Royale".

She was also known as La Petite Madame to distinguish her from her aunts, the wives of her uncle Monsieur, who were known as the first Madame (Henrietta of England) (died 1670) and the second Madame (Elisabeth Charlotte of the Palatinate) (died 1722). The young Marie Thérèse died of consumption on 1 March 1672 at the Château de Saint-Germain-en-Laye and was buried at the Royal Basilica of Saint Denis, outside Paris, France. The music for the funeral ceremony was composed by Marc-Antoine Charpentier (H.409, H.189, H.331).

Ancestry

Patrilineal descent

Patrilineal descent is the principle behind membership in royal houses, as it can be traced back through the generations - which means that if Princess Marie Thérèse were to choose an historically accurate house name it would be Robertian, as all her male-line ancestors have been of that house.

Marie Thérèse is a member of the House of Bourbon, a branch of the Capetian dynasty and of the Robertians.

Marie Thérèse's patriline is the line from which she is descended father to son. It follows the Dukes of Parma as well as the Kings of Spain, France, and Navarre. The line can be traced back more than 1,200 years to the present day and is one of the oldest in Europe.

Robert II of Worms and Rheingau (Robert of Hesbaye), 770 - 807
Robert III of Worms and Rheingau, 808 - 834
Robert IV the Strong, 820 - 866
Robert I of France, 866 - 923
Hugh the Great, 895 - 956
Hugh Capet, 941 - 996
Robert II of France, 972 - 1031
Henry I of France, 1008–1060
Philip I of France, 1053–1108
Louis VI of France, 1081–1137
Louis VII of France, 1120–1180
Philip II of France, 1165–1223
Louis VIII of France, 1187–1226
Louis IX of France, 1215–1270
Robert, Count of Clermont, 1256–1317
Louis I, Duke of Bourbon, 1279–1342
James I, Count of La Marche, 1319–1362
John I, Count of La Marche, 1344–1393
Louis, Count of Vendôme, 1376–1446
Jean VIII, Count of Vendôme, 1428–1478
François, Count of Vendôme, 1470–1495
Charles de Bourbon, Duke of Vendôme, 1489–1537
Antoine, King of Navarre, Duke of Vendôme, 1518–1562
Henry IV, King of France and of Navarre, 1553–1610
Louis XIII, King of France and Navarre, 1601–1643
Louis XIV, King of France and Navarre, 1638–1715
Marie Thérèse of France, Madame Royale, 1667-1672

References

1667 births
1672 deaths
17th-century French people
17th-century French women
17th-century deaths from tuberculosis
Burials at the Basilica of Saint-Denis
Princesses of France (Bourbon)
Tuberculosis deaths in France
Children of Louis XIV
Royalty and nobility who died as children
Daughters of kings